Sichuan embroidery or Shu embroidery, is a style of embroidery folk art native to Sichuan and Chongqing, particularly renowned for its brocade fabrics known as Shu brocade. This technique of embroidery originates from Chengdu, the capital of Sichuan, during the time of the Ancient Kingdom of Shu (?–). An excavation of four tombs dating back to the Western Han dynasty (202 BC – 8 AD), on Mount Laoguan located in Tianhui Town, Chengdu, has confirmed the use of patterning looms for weaving warp-faced compounds in that period.

Technique 

Sichuan embroidery is based on the use of coloured silk and satin cloth. It is marked by its even stitching and subtle colours. The general closeness of the stitches allows for embroidering intricate details. The designs of embroidery often featured animals, flowers, leaves, mountains, rivers, trees and human figures. These silk products were a combination of fine art and practical use, as it is used to decorate pillow cases, shoes, quilt covers, garments, and folding screens.

Peculiarities 

Sichuan embroidery is one of the so-called "four great embroideries of China" along with Cantonese embroidery, Suzhou embroidery and Xiang embroidery. Throughout its history, Sichuan embroidery developed a quality of being smooth, bright, neat, and influenced by its own geographical environment, various customs and cultures, with significant foreign influences being Sasanian, Sogdian and Hellenistic during the 1st millennium.

The Sui and Tang dynasties (581–907) saw the golden age of Sichuan embroidery, when it enjoyed high popularity throughout the regions immediately to the west of China (Chinese Turkestan), Central Asia and Western Asia. Novel themes and patterns from these regions were incorporated into embroidery designs during this period. In the Book of Sui, it is recorded that in the year 605, the head of the Sichuan ateliers producing silks in the "western style" was a certain He Chou, a name which betrays his Sogdian origins. A classification of various types of Sichuan brocade is found in Dunhuang manuscripts preserved in the Bibliothèque nationale de France.

Gallery

See also 
 Bashu culture
 Byzantine silk
 Coptic textiles
 Embroidery of India
 Persian embroidery
 Samite
 Sampul tapestry
 Sogdian textiles

References 

Chinese embroidery
Embroidery
Embroidery
Shu (state)